

8th Air Corps (VIII. Fliegerkorps) was formed 19 July 1939 in Oppeln as Fliegerführer z.b.V. ("for special purposes"). It was renamed to the 8th Air Corps on 10 November 1939. The Corps was also known as Luftwaffenkommando Schlesien between 25 January 1945 and 2 February 1945 and was merged with Luftgau-Kommando VIII on 28 April 1945 and redesignated Luftwaffenkommando VIII.

Commanding officers
 Generaloberst Wolfram Freiherr von Richthofen, 19 July 1939 – 30 June 1942
 General der Flieger Martin Fiebig, 1 July 1942 – 21 May 1943
 General der Flieger Hans Seidemann, 21 May 1943 – 28 April 1945

See also
 Luftwaffe Organization

References
 

A008
Military units and formations established in 1939
Crete in World War II
1939 establishments in Germany
Military units and formations disestablished in 1945